This is a list of mayors of the city of Bellinzona, Switzerland. The sindaco chairs the municipio, the executive of Bellinzona.

Bellinzona
 
Bellinzona
Lists of mayors (complete 1900-2013)